Crosse is a surname, and may refer to:

 Andrew Crosse (1784–1855), British amateur scientist
 Charles Crosse, British rugby
 Charles G. Crosse, American physician and politician
 Edmond Francis Crosse (1858-1941), first Archdeacon of Chesterfield
 John Crosse (announcer) (born 1939), English radio DJ, presenter and continuity announcer
 John Crosse (antiquary) (1786–1833), British antiquary and music writer
 John Green Crosse (1790-1850), English surgeon
 Joseph Charles Hippolyte Crosse (1826-1898), a French conchologist
 Lavinia Crosse, founder of the Community of All Hallows religious order
 Roger Crosse, character in James Clavell's novel Noble House
 Rupert Crosse (1927–1973), American television and film actor
 Victoria Crosse, a pseudonym of novelist Annie Sophie Cory (1868–1952)

See also
 Crosse Baronets, title in the Baronetage of Great Britain
 Lacrosse stick, sometimes known as a crosse
 Cross (surname)
 Cross (disambiguation)
 Crosses (disambiguation)